François Borne (1840–1920), sometimes spelled Bourne, was a French flautist playing with the orchestra of Grand Théâtre de Bordeaux, composer and professor at "Conservatoire de Musique de Toulouse" (High School for Music in Toulouse). He is recognized for technical improvements to the flute. Furthermore, he is remembered today for his composition Fantasie Brillante on Themes from Bizet's Carmen which is a staple of the Romantic flute repertoire.

References

1840 births
1920 deaths
19th-century classical composers
20th-century classical composers
French male classical composers
French classical flautists
Musicians from Toulouse
French Romantic composers
19th-century French composers
20th-century French composers
20th-century French male musicians
19th-century French male musicians
20th-century flautists